"The Train" is the fifth and final single to be released from OutKast's sixth studio album, Idlewild. The song features Scar and Sleepy Brown on guest vocals. The single was released in December 2006, and was the last official single to be released by Outkast.

Track listings
UK CD single
 "The Train" (clean version) – 4:26
 "The Train" (explicit version) – 4:26
 "The Train" (instrumental) – 4:26

 12" vinyl single
 "The Train" (clean version) – 4:26
 "The Train" (explicit version) – 4:26
 "The Train" (instrumental) – 4:26
 "N2U" (clean version) – 5:18
 "N2U" (explicit version) – 5:18
 "N2U" (instrumental) – 5:18

Charts

References

2006 singles
Outkast songs
Songs written by André 3000
Songs written by Big Boi
Songs written by Snoop Dogg
2006 songs
Songs written by Lil Wayne
Sony BMG singles
LaFace Records singles